Silent Company is the second album by Australian power metal band, Black Majesty, which was released on 27 June 2005 via their German-based label, Limb Music.

Justin Donnelly of The Metal Forge rated the album at seven-out-of ten stars and explained "a solid release, and a worthy follow up to Sands of Time... [but it] sees the band relying on their known strengths rather than delving into new territory and trying something new."

Track listing

All songs written by Black Majesty, except track 3, written by Jon English.
 "Dragon Reborn" - 6:05
 "Silent Company" - 4:28
 "Six Ribbons" - 3:22 
 "Firestorm" - 5:27
 "New Horizons" - 5:28
 "Darkened Room" - 5:13
 "Visionary" - 4:46 
 "Never Surrender" - 4:36
 "A Better Way to Die" - 7:37

Credits

Band members

 John "Gio" Cavaliere − lead vocals
 Stevie Janevski − guitars, backing vocals
 Hanny Mohamed − guitars, keyboards
 Pavel Konvalinka  − drums

Additional musicians

 Evan Harris − Bass
 Jason Old - Backing Vocals on tracks 2, 4, 5, 6 & 7
 Susie Goritchan - Backing Vocals on track 3
 Endel Rivers - Keyboards

Production and other arrangements

 Endel Rivers - Engineering, Mixing, Production
 Piet Sielck - Drum track recording
 Christian Schmid - Mastering
 Dirk Illing - Cover concept, artwork
 Thomas Ewerhard - Sleeve design

References 

2005 albums
Black Majesty albums
Limb Music albums